The Interferin' Gent is a 1926 American silent Western film directed by Richard Thorpe. It stars Jay Wilsey, Al Taylor, and Olive Hasbrouck. It was released on August 21, 1927.

Cast list
 Jay Wilsey as Bill Stannard (credited as Buffalo Bill Jr.)
 Olive Hasbrouck as Ann Douglas
 Al Taylor as Ben Douglas
 Harry Todd as Buddy
 Jack McDonald as Joe Luke

References

1926 films
Films directed by Richard Thorpe
1926 Western (genre) films
American black-and-white films
Pathé Exchange films
Silent American Western (genre) films
1920s American films